Xenodontinae is a subfamily of snakes in the family Colubridae.

The subfamily Xenodontinae encompasses a number of rear-fanged (opisthoglyphous), mildly venomous snake genera found in South America and the Caribbean. Members of the subfamily Xenodontinae are by definition closer relatives to the genus Xenodon than they are to the genus Dipsas. Some authors consider Xenodontinae and Dipsadinae to be synonymous. If the two names are used synonymously, then Dipsadinae is the correct name because it is older.

Genera

When used as a subfamily of Dipsadidae, Xenodontinae does not include genera placed in the subfamily Dipsadinae (e.g. Dipsas, Sibon, Coniophanes, Atractus, Geophis, Hypsiglena, Imantodes, Leptodeira, Ninia, Rhadinaea, Urotheca) nor the North American relict genera (Heterodon, Farancia, Diadophis, Carphophis, Contia), nor the Asian genus Thermophis, because these are too distantly-related to Xenodon.

References

Snake subfamilies
Dipsadinae